Gasteruption assectator, the wild carrot wasp, is a species of carrot wasp in the family Gasteruptiidae. It is found in the Czech Republic, Slovakia, and Hungary. G. assectator is a generalist inquiline parasitoid of many other bee and wasp species such as Hylaeus confusus, Hylaeus pectoralis, and Pemphredon fabricii.

References

Further reading

External links

 

Evanioidea
Wasps described in 1758
Taxa named by Carl Linnaeus